Tabernaemontana bovina is a species of plant in the family Apocynaceae. It is found in southern China and northern Indochina.

References

bovina